Jerry Lou Donga (born 31 January 1991) is a Solomon Islands footballer currently for domestic club Solomon Warriors in Solomon Islands S-League.

International goals
As of match played 2 December 2017. Solomon Islands score listed first, score column indicates score after each Donga goal.

References

External links
 

1991 births
Living people
Solomon Islands footballers
Association football forwards
Solomon Islands international footballers